Guanylyl cyclase-activating protein 1 is an enzyme that in humans is encoded by the GUCA1A gene.

References

Further reading

EF-hand-containing proteins